The Cambodian Landmine Museum and Relief Facility is a museum located in Cambodia, south of the Banteay Srey Temple complex, 25 kilometers north of Siem Reap, and inside the Angkor National Park.

History
Tourists began hearing stories about a young Khmer man, Aki Ra, who cleared landmines with a stick and had a house full of defused ordnance. Ra began charging a dollar to see his collection, using the money to help further his activities. Thus began the Cambodia Landmine Museum.

In 2007 the Cambodian government ordered Aki Ra’s museum closed.  He was allowed to move it to a new location 40 kilometers from Siem Reap, near Banteay Srey Temple, inside the Angkor National Park. A Canadian NGO, the Cambodia Landmine Museum Relief Fund, founded by documentary film producer Richard Fitoussi, raised the money to buy the land and build the Museum.  Most of the funding was provided by Tom Shadyac, a movie director from California.

The new museum opened in May 2007 and currently houses a 4 gallery museum as well as being the home to 27 children.  The Cambodia Landmine Museum exists for 3 reasons:

 To tell Aki Ra’s story
 To tell the world about the horrors of landmines and explain that war is only half the problem. The aftermath of war continues long after the shooting stops.
 To care for the children who live at the museum.

Note
The Cambodia Landmine Museum and Cambodian Self Help Demining are distinctly separate NGOs.  They are headquartered in separate locations, run by different individuals (although Aki Ra is the MD), and funded entirely separately.

The Museum and Child Relief Center is funded by revenues gained from ticket sales, donations, and sales from the small shop.

External links

Cambodia Landmine Museum
Cambodian Self Help Demining
Landmine Relief Fund
Cambodian Mine Action Center

Military and war museums in Cambodia
Museums in Siem Reap
Land mines